Federal Highway 92D is a toll highway in Guerrero, with contiguous segments connecting Taxco to Rancho Viejo and Rancho Viejo to Zacapalco. The road is operated by Caminos y Puentes Federales, which charges 42 pesos per car to travel Highway 92D (14 for the first segment and 28 for the second).

References 

Mexican Federal Highways